UGN may refer to:

UGN, IATA identifier for Waukegan Regional Airport, in Waukegan Lake County, Illinois, USA
UGN meaning Upper Great News broadcast on WBKP and WBUP
UGN, a 2000 model of Unimog multi-purpose auto four wheel drive trucks produced by Mercedes-Benz
ugn, ISO 639 identifier for Ugandan Sign Language
United Galactic Navy (UGN) the third most powerful Blockland space clan of all time that operated between 2009 - 2011 - related to Geographic coordinate system 
United Gay Network (UGN), film production house established Michael Akers and Sandon Berg